Ekaterina Dimitrova (Bulgarian Cyrillic: Екатерина Димитрова, born on 23 November 1987 in Plovdiv) is an  international basketball player from Bulgaria, considered to be among the most talented female basketballers in the country. She has represented Bulgaria at all junior national levels and is also a member of the senior team.
 
Dimitrova married Batiste Kiurkulos in 2014. She has been active when it comes to charity causes.

References

1987 births
Living people
Sportspeople from Plovdiv
Bulgarian women's basketball players
Small forwards
Bulgarian expatriate sportspeople in Israel
Bulgarian expatriate sportspeople in France
Bulgarian expatriate sportspeople in Italy